Michael David Hodson (born 2 August 1942) is a former English cricketer. Hodson was a right-handed batsman who fielded as a wicket-keeper. He was born in Grimsby, Lincolnshire.

Hodson made his debut for Lincolnshire in the 1974 Minor Counties Championship against the Yorkshire Second XI. Hodson played Minor counties cricket for Lincolnshire from 1974 to 1978, which included 40 Minor Counties Championship matches. He made his only List A appearance for Lincolnshire against Derbyshire in the 1976 Gillette Cup. He scored 16 unbeaten runs in the match. In 1979, he played 2 List A matches for Minor Counties North in the Benson & Hedges Cup against Kent and Middlesex.

References

External links
Michael Hodson at ESPNcricinfo
Michael Hodson at CricketArchive

1942 births
Living people
Cricketers from Grimsby
English cricketers
Lincolnshire cricketers
Minor Counties cricketers
Wicket-keepers